Ti ho voluto bene veramente is a song recorded by Italian singer-songwriter Marco Mengoni for his album Le cose che non ho. The track, written by Marco Mengoni was produced by Michele Canova.

After being released in October 2015 as the lead single from Mengoni's fourth studio album, Le cose che non ho, it peaked at number one on the Italian FIMI Top Digital Downloads charts.

Music video
The music video for the song was directed by Niccolò Celaia and Antonio Usbergo, and was shot in Iceland.

Track listing

Certifications

References

External links
 Official video on YouTube

2015 singles
2015 songs
Marco Mengoni songs
Number-one singles in Italy
Sony Music singles
Songs written by Marco Mengoni
Songs written by Fortunato Zampaglione
Song recordings produced by Michele Canova
Music videos shot in Iceland